George Lewis was a professional rugby league footballer who played in the 1920s, 1930s and 1940s.

Playing career

County League appearances
George Lewis played in Castleford's victories in the Yorkshire County League during the 1932–33 season, and 1938–39 season.

Challenge Cup Final appearances
George Lewis played  in Castleford's 11-8 victory over Huddersfield in the 1935 Challenge Cup Final during the 1934–35 season at Wembley Stadium, London on Saturday 4 May 1935, in front of a crowd of 39,000.

Club career
George Lewis made his début for Featherstone Rovers on Saturday 14 April 1945.

References

External links
Search for "Lewis" at rugbyleagueproject.org

Castleford Tigers players
English rugby league players
Featherstone Rovers players
Place of birth missing
Place of death missing
Rugby league fullbacks
Year of birth missing
Year of death missing